The Central Foreign Affairs Commission is a commission of the Central Committee of the Chinese Communist Party (CCP) that exercises general oversight on matters related to foreign affairs. It is currently chaired by CCP General Secretary and President Xi Jinping, with Premier Li Keqiang as its deputy leader. The main execution body of the commission is the General Office, with the director of the Office being China's top diplomat, currently Wang Yi. Since 1993, the leader of the group had also served as General Secretary of the Chinese Communist Party and President of the People's Republic of China.

History 
The commission was first established in 1981 as the Central Foreign Affairs Leading Group (FALG or FALSG). Established in 1981, the FALG was chaired until 1988 by Li Xiannian, a leading member of the Eight Elders, CCP Vice-chairman from 1977 to 1982, and Chinese president from 1983 to 1988; Li represented the interests of nationalist hard-liners and economic leftists, and generally opposed the policies of Deng Xiaoping, then-de facto leader. During the 1990s, the Chinese leadership became more institutionalized and less focused on factional and informal politics.

In March 2018, the leading group was redesignated the Central Foreign Affairs Commission.

Membership 
Since November 2017

Leader
Xi Jinping, General Secretary of the Chinese Communist Party, President of the People's Republic of China, Chairman of the Central Military Commission
Deputy leader
Li Keqiang, Premier of the People's Republic of China, Politburo Standing Committee of the Chinese Communist Party member
Director of General Office and Secretary-General
Wang Yi, Politburo of the Chinese Communist Party member 
Group members
Wang Qishan, Vice President of the People's Republic of China
Others to be announced

Chronological list of leaders 
 Li Xiannian, CCP Vice-chairman, President (1981–1988)
 Li Peng, CCP Politburo Standing Committee member and Premier (1988–1993)
 Jiang Zemin, CCP General Secretary and President (1993–2004)
 Hu Jintao, CCP General Secretary and President (2004–2013)
 Xi Jinping, CCP General Secretary and President (2013–)

References

See also 
 Foreign relations of the People's Republic of China
 Ministry of Foreign Affairs of the People's Republic of China
 National Security Commission of the Chinese Communist Party

Foreign relations of China
Institutions of the Central Committee of the Chinese Communist Party
Government agencies of China
Government agencies established in 1981
1981 establishments in China